Thomas Melges (born 1 January 1969) is a German lightweight rower. He won a gold medal at the 1989 World Rowing Championships in Bled with the lightweight men's quadruple scull.

References

1969 births
Living people
German male rowers
World Rowing Championships medalists for West Germany
World Rowing Championships medalists for Germany